Kurasini is an administrative ward in the Temeke District of the Dar es Salaam Region of Tanzania. According to the 2002 census, the ward has a total population of 34,501. It is the location of the Port of Dar es Salaam, the fourth-largest port in Africa on the Indian Ocean.

See also
 Port of Dar es Salaam

References

Temeke District
Wards of Dar es Salaam Region